Wild Horse Plains is a locality in South Australia on the eastern coastline of Gulf St Vincent about  north-northwest of the Adelaide city centre. Its name is attributed to Thomas Day, who found wild horses grazing within the locality around 1870. Its boundaries, created in June 1997, include the town of Wild Horse Plains, established in 1881 on Port Wakefield Road, and the former Government Town of Lorne. Port Lorne Road marks most of the northern boundary of Wild Horse Plains and is the access road to the former township of Lorne.

Wild Horse Plains lies within the federal Division of Grey, the state electoral district of Narungga and the local government area of the Adelaide Plains Council.

The post office opened in 1878, continued as a telephone exchange and closed in 1979. 

Wild Horse Plains formally had a school for all ages known as Wild Horse Plains School.

See also
List of cities and towns in South Australia

References

Towns in South Australia